The Episcopal Diocese of Maine is a diocese of the Episcopal Church in the United States of America and encompasses the entire State of Maine.  It is part of the Province of New England — Province I of the ECUSA.

The Diocese has 57 year-round congregations and 17 summer chapels. The see city is Portland. Its cathedral is the Cathedral Church of St. Luke. Thomas J. Brown was elected tenth Bishop of Maine on February 9, 2019. Brown was consecrated and assumed office on June 22, 2019. Brown is the first openly gay bishop to lead the diocese.

The Diocese of Maine was created in 1820 from the Eastern Diocese (which included all of New England save Connecticut) and elected its first bishop, George Burgess in 1847.

Bishops
George Burgess (1847 - 1866)
Henry A. Neely (1867 - 1899)
Robert Codman (1900 - 1915)
Benjamin Brewster (1916 - 1940)
Oliver Leland Loring (1941 - 1968)
Frederick Wolf (1968-1986)
Edward C. Chalfant (1986 - 1996)
Chilton R. Knudsen (1998 - 2008)
Stephen T. Lane (2008 - 2019)
Thomas J. Brown (2019–present)

References

External links
Official Web site of the Diocese of Maine
Episcopal Maine YouTube Channel
Journal of the Annual Convention, Diocese of Maine at the Online Books Page

Maine
Diocese of Maine
Religious organizations established in 1820
Anglican dioceses established in the 19th century
1820 establishments in Maine
Province 1 of the Episcopal Church (United States)